Mahamane Baby is a Malian politician. He serves as the Malian Minister of Employment & Professional Training.

References

Living people
Government ministers of Mali
Year of birth missing (living people)
Place of birth missing (living people)
21st-century Malian people